The Battle of Koprukoy was part of the Caucasus Campaign during World War I between the Russian Empire and the Ottoman Empire, and occurred as the Russians were advancing to Erzurum. The Russians achieved total surprise and broke through the Ottoman defenses, sending the Third Army retreating towards Erzurum.

The Third Army was well positioned.  There were two lines of defenses, carefully positioned to take advantage of the terrain, with wire obstacles to impede the attackers covered by machine guns backed up by artillery.  The weakness of the position was a lack of reserves to deal with a break-through by the Russian Army.

The Russians had good information about the nature of the Ottoman defenses, including the lack of reserves.  General Yudenich decided to break through at the boundary between the northern and central sectors of their line, near the Cakir-baba ridge.  With great secrecy the 4th Caucasian Rifle Division was positioned to make the decisive attack.

The Russian plan started with a number of diversionary attacks that tied down Ottoman troops and local reserves on January 10, 1916.  Those attacks often suffered high casualties but accomplished their goal.  After several days of fighting the Ottoman commander, Abdul Kerim Pasha, moved his only reserve, the 17th Division, to what he thought was the Russian main attack.

The Ottomans launched their counterattack on January 13.  At four o'clock that day, with artillery fire from the 34h Division, the 102nd Regiment captured Sansor Tepe. It was to continue the battle with the 28th Division of the IXth Corps and the 18th and 34th Divisions of the XIth Corps. The 33rd Division was to advance from the south of the Aras river and then turn north, cross the river, and suddenly attack the Russian front.

However, on January 14 Yudenich launched his attacks near the Cakir-baba ridge.  Most Ottoman forces were out of position to stop it.  Against heavy resistance and very bad weather the Russians advanced.  By January 15, they were on the verge of breaking through.  Yudenich, anticipating it, sent the Siberian Cossacks to that sector, as they were the only horsed unit that could operate in such weather.  However, on the night of the 16th-17th the Ottomans withdrew.  The Siberian Cossacks did annihilate the rear guard, but most of the Ottomans withdrew into the Erzurum fortress to the west.  The Third Army had lost about 20,000 out of the 65,000 soldiers it had started the battle with.  The Russian Army lost about 10,000 and 2,000 more with severe frostbite out of 75,000.

References

See also 
Battle of Erzurum (1916)

Koprukoy
Koprukoy
Koprukoy
History of Erzurum Province
January 1916 events